Holy Family Catholic School (formerly Holy Family Technology College) is a coeducational Roman Catholic secondary school and sixth form in the Walthamstow area of East London, England.

Description
The school is based on two sites: the Walthamstow House site and the Wiseman House site. Both sites are located on Shernhall Street. Year 7's to Year 8's attend the Walthamstow House site and Year 9's and higher attend the Wiseman House site.

First established in 1988, it is a voluntary aided school administered by Waltham Forest London Borough Council and the Roman Catholic Diocese of Brentwood. The school celebrated its silver jubilee throughout 2012 and 2013.

Holy Family Catholic School offers GCSEs as programmes of study for pupils, while students in the sixth form have the option to study a range of A Levels and BTECs. The school also has a specialism in Technology, and has dedicated resources to support the specialism.

Walthamstow House

The school's building Walthamstow House was bought by Sir Robert Wigram, 1st Baronet and he lived there with Lady Eleanor Wigram. She organised the first National School in Walthamstow. They were involved in a number of other organisations. Eleanor was into founding charities and Robert imported medicinal drugs and then, with Eleanor's advice, made some very successful investments. They had a huge family of children with a good number of over achievers.

Notable former pupils
Lethal Bizzle - Rapper/ Grime artist
Lutalo Muhammad - British Taekwondo Athlete (Olympic Bronze and Silver Medalist)
Stephen Bear - Celebrity Big Brother winner 2016, Ex on the Beach Star
 Fleur East - X Factor,  I'm a Celebrity...Get Me Out of Here!,

References

External links
Holy Family Catholic School official website

Secondary schools in the London Borough of Waltham Forest
Catholic secondary schools in the Diocese of Brentwood
Educational institutions established in 1988
1988 establishments in England
Voluntary aided schools in England
Walthamstow